The 1975 Auburn Tigers football team achieved an overall record of 3–6–2 and 1–4–1 in the SEC in Ralph "Shug" Jordan's last year as head coach at Auburn after 25 years; however, the official record improved to 4–6–1 (2–4) when Mississippi State forfeited its tie that year due to NCAA imposed sanctions.

Three players were named to the All-SEC first team for 1975: Chuck Fletcher (offensive tackle), Rick Telhieard (defensive tackle), and Clyde Baumgartner (special teams).

Schedule

Roster

References

Auburn
Auburn Tigers football seasons
Auburn Tigers football